Cefn-y-bedd is a village in Flintshire, north-east Wales.

The name translates into English as "the ridge of the grave", in reference to an old tumulus which a local tale said was the burial place of Gwrle Gawr, the legendary figure after whom Caergwrle was said to be named.

Cefn-y-bedd is on the A541 road to the south of its junction with the A550 road at Abermorddu. The village is served by Cefn-y-Bedd railway station on the Borderlands Line, linking Wrexham and Bidston on the Wirral Peninsula.

It is in the community of Llanfynydd, Flintshire.

References

Villages in Flintshire